Aleksandr Sergeyevich Kislov (born 4 November 1984) is a Russian decathlete.

Achievements

External links 

1984 births
Living people
Russian decathletes
Place of birth missing (living people)